Xenosaurus  newmanorum, Newman's knob-scaled lizard, is a lizard found in Mexico.

References

Xenosauridae
Reptiles described in 1949
Reptiles of Mexico
Taxa named by Edward Harrison Taylor